Cora Vander Broek (born November 20, 1977)  is an American actress. She was nominated for the Tony Award for Best Featured Actress in a Play in 2020 for her Broadway-debut performance as Jules in Linda Vista by Tracy Letts.

She has appeared on television in Grace and Frankie, Chicago Fire, and Law & Order: SVU.

Life and career 
Cora F. Vanderbroek was born in Orange City, Iowa, the daughter of Diane (née Vander Stoep) and Thomas Vander Broek (1951-2006). She has a sister, Renee, and two brothers, Caleb and Michael. Her mother is an English teacher and father was a pilot. They worked for a Christian missionary and she spent her early years living with her parents in Indonesia and Honduras, before they returned to Iowa. She graduated from MOC-Floyd Valley High School and Northwestern College in 2000. In high school, she was active in theatre and speech and debate.

She was mentored by Jeff Barker, theatre professor at Northwestern, and his wife Karen during her college years. Vander Broek also performed in plays at the annual Orange City Tulip Festival. Her mother was Tulip Festival Queen in 1972. Vander Broek returned to Orange City in 2015 to perform the play Map of My Kingdom by Mary Swander at the Northwestern College DeWitt Theatre.

After college, she moved to Chicago and began auditioning. She took additional acting classes at Steppenwolf. In 2007, she was nominated for the Joseph Jefferson Award for Best Supporting Actress for her performance as Drina in Dead End at the Griffin Theatre.

Vander Broek starred in the Chicago (Steppenwolf), and Los Angeles (Mark Taper Forum) productions of Linda Vista, before it opened on Broadway at the Hayes Theater.

She later moved to Los Angeles, where she currently lives with her husband, Matthew Brumlow, who is also an actor.

External links

References 

1977 births
Living people
Actresses from Iowa
American stage actresses
People from Orange City, Iowa
Northwestern College (Iowa) alumni
21st-century American women